Huang Fan (Chinese:黃凡) is a contemporary Taiwanese writer, born in 1950.

He grew up in a family dependents community, like many people from Mainland China who arrived with Chiang Kai-shek in 1949. His educational background is in engineering. He is now a professional writer.

His fiction is urbane and often experimental in technique.

He had been disappeared in the literary circle for more than 10 years, from about 1990 to 2003.

External links
List of translations of Huang Fan's work

References

Taiwanese male novelists
1950 births
Living people
Writers from Taipei